Fates & Furies is a South Korean television series starring Lee Min-jung, Joo Sang-wook, So Yi-hyun and Lee Ki-woo. It aired four consecutive episodes every Saturday on SBS TV from December 1, 2018 to February 9, 2019.

Fates & Furies is the final weekend special project drama series of SBS.

Synopsis
Even though Goo Hae-ra (Lee Min-jung) is smart and beautiful, she is in a miserable situation because of her family. Her older sister attempted suicide and her father died. The only way she can escape her situation is with money. She approaches Tae In-joon (Joo Sang-wook). He is the second son of a shoe company owner. Tae In-joon falls in love with Goo Hae-ra.

Cast

Main
 Lee Min-jung as Goo Hae-ra
 A woman who begins to love under false pretenses in order to change her fate. 
 Joo Sang-wook as Tae In-joon
Choi Seung-hoon as young In-joon
 The second son of a Chaebol family who pursues Goo Hae-ra because he considers her his fate. He also intends to become the owner of his family's company by getting his stepmother and older half-brother out of the way. 
 So Yi-hyun as Cha Soo-hyun
 An ambitious and greedy woman who dislikes Goo Hae-ra because she is in the way of her marriage to Tae In-joon. 
 Lee Ki-woo as Jin Tae-oh
 A man who was betrayed by Cha Soo-hyun and now seeks revenge.

Recurring
 Cha Soo-yeon as Goo Hyun-joo
 Goo Hae-ra's sister who is in a coma
 Jung Kyoo-soo as Goo Dong-seok
 Goo Hae-ra's father, a shoemaker 
 Jung Soo-young as Kang Sun-young
 Goo Hae-ra's friend
 Jung Yoon-hak as Kang Ui-gun
 Kang Sun-young's younger brother
 Shim Yi-young as Ko A-jung
 Tae Jung-ho's wife, who is ignored by her mother-in-law
 Kong Jung-hwan as Tae Jung-ho
 Tae In-joon's older half-brother
 Song Ok-sook as Han Sung-sook
 Tae In-joon's stepmother
 Ko In-beom as Tae Pil-woon
 Tae In-joon's father and the head of the company
 Heo Joon-seok as Kim Chang-soo
 A loan shark who harasses Goo Hae-ra
 Jo Seung-yeon as Hyun Jung-soo
 Kwon Tae-won as Cha Dong-kyoo
 Im Ji-kyu as Assistant Kim
 Jo Wan-ki as Kim Seok-jin
 Park Soo-ah as Tae Jung-min

Production
 The first script reading took place on September 11, 2018 at SBS Studio in Tanhyun, Ilsan, South Korea.
 Lee Min-jung and Joo Sang-wook previously starred together in Cunning Single Lady (2014).

Original soundtrack

Part 1

Part 2

Part 3

Part 4

Part 5

Ratings
 In the table below,  represent the lowest ratings and  represent the highest ratings.
 NR denotes that the drama did not rank in the top 20 daily programs on that date.
 N/A denotes that the rating is not known.

Episodes 9-12 did not air on December 15 due to the broadcast of the 2018 AFF Championship Final between Vietnam and Malaysia, which Park Hang-seo, the coach of Vietnam, is a Korean.

References

External links 
 
 

Seoul Broadcasting System television dramas
2018 South Korean television series debuts
Korean-language television shows
South Korean romance television series
South Korean melodrama television series
2019 South Korean television series endings
Television series by IHQ (company)